The sixteenth edition of LOS40 Music Awards was held at the Velòdrom Illes Balears in Palma de Mallorca, on November 12, 2021. Ed Sheeran was the most-awarded artist at the ceremony, winning a total of four awards for Best Artist, Best Song and Video (for "Bad Habits"), and Best Live Act.

Performers

On October 24, 2021, Ed Sheeran announced that he had tested positive for Covid-19 and would be fulfilling all subsequent commitments remotely. The singer completed his quarantine by November 2 and was cleared to resume in-person promotional activities for =, including his appearance at Los40.

Winners and nominees
Nominees were revealed on October 5, 2021, at an announcement dinner held in Ibiza. C. Tangana and Ed Sheeran were the most-nominated artists overall, as well as in the national and international sections respectively, with four nominations each. Rauw Alejandro and Sebastián Yatra led the Latin nominees with three nominations apiece. Sheeran won all four of his nominations and was the most-nominated artist of the night, while C.Tangana won two of his four. Winners are listed first and highlighted in bold.

References

2021 music awards